Hanna Simon was the Ambassador of the Republic of Eritrea to France between 1999 and 2006.  She was also their Permanent Delegate to UNESCO, presenting her credentials in July 2014.

References 

Living people
Women ambassadors
Permanent Delegates of Eritrea to UNESCO
Ambassadors of Eritrea to France
Year of birth missing (living people)